Cornelia Renner is a former competitive figure skater who represented West Germany. She won gold at the 1984 Prague Skate, bronze at the 1986 Fujifilm Trophy, silver at the 1986 Nebelhorn Trophy, and bronze at the 1986 Grand Prix International St. Gervais.

Competitive highlights

References 

German female single skaters
Living people
Year of birth missing (living people)